Espeluy is a town located in the province of Jaén, Spain. The town was reorganized and repopulated by the Instituto Nacional de Colonización in the 1950s. According to the 2006 census of the INE, the city has a population of 750 inhabitants.

References

External links 
 Ayuntamiento de Espeluy

Municipalities in the Province of Jaén (Spain)